Lieutenant General Randle Joseph Feilden,  (1824 – 19 May 1895) was a British Army officer, businessman and Conservative politician who represented several Lancashire constituencies.

Feilden was born at Clifton, Bristol, the second son of Joseph Feilden of Witton Park, Lancashire. A brother was Canon Feilden. He was an officer in the 60th Rifles. He was elected MP for North Lancashire in 1880, and when the constituency was restructured became MP for Chorley. He held the seat until his death.

In 1861, Feilden married his first cousin once removed, Jane Campbell Hozier, daughter of James Hozier, Esq. of Maudslie Castle, Lanarkshire, by Catherine Margaret, second daughter of Sir William Feilden, 1st Baronet. Among  their children were:
 Percy Henry Guy Feilden (1870–1944), married in St Paul's Church, Knightsbridge on 11 November 1902 Hon. Dorothy Louisa Brand (1878–1958), daughter of Henry Brand, 2nd Viscount Hampden; they had three children: Randle Guy Feilden (1904–1981), Cecil Henry Feilden (b. 1907) and Dorothy Priscilla Feilden (b. 1909).
 Captain R. B. Feilden

Lord of the Manor of Witton, Lancashire, Feilden resided at Witton House.

References

External links
 
 Katharine Feilden and Headington, Headington, Oxford website
 The Feilden Family, Cotton Town Project, accessed 16 May 2008

|-

1824 births
1895 deaths
British Army lieutenant generals
Companions of the Order of St Michael and St George
Conservative Party (UK) MPs for English constituencies
King's Royal Rifle Corps officers
People from Blackburn
UK MPs 1880–1885
UK MPs 1885–1886
UK MPs 1886–1892
UK MPs 1892–1895
Military personnel from Bristol